Donker Mag  (Afrikaans for "dark power") is the third studio album by South African hip hop and rave group Die Antwoord. It was released on 3 June 2014 by Zef Records.

Singles
The album's lead single "Cookie Thumper!" was released on 18 June 2013. A music video for the second single "Pitbull Terrier" was released on 20 May 2014. A music video for "Ugly Boy" was released on 4 November 2014. Directed by Ninja, this video, rich in cameos, features Jack Black, Marilyn Manson, Red Hot Chili Peppers bassist Flea, burlesque dancer Dita Von Teese, the ATL twins (Sewell Brothers), and English model Cara Delevingne.

Track listing

Notes
 "Don't Fuk Me" quotes the movie Scarface, where Ninja's monologue came from.
 "Ugly Boy" features, heavily, a sample from the song "Ageispolis" by Aphex Twin.
 "Happy Go Sucky Fucky" is based on the song "Expander" from the game Streets of Rage 2, scored by Yuzo Koshiro and Motohiro Kawashima.
 "Raging Zef Boner" has a fake advertisement at the end, which features a quote from Lord of the Rings, in which Gandalf asks Frodo to keep the Ring secret and safe pending his return.
 "Girl I Want 2 Eat U"  quotes the dub of Azumanga Daioh, where Yolandi's monologue at the end of the song came from.
 "Pitbull Terrier" is based on the song "Pit Bull" by Emir Kusturica and the No Smoking Orchestra from the Black Cat, White Cat soundtrack.
"Moon Love" is from the album Good Morning South Africa by MaxNormal.TV, Ninja and Yolandi's earlier hip-hop group, and features their daughter, Sixteen Jones, as a toddler.
 "Sex" is based  on the song "Sea, Sex and Sun" by Serge Gainsbourg.

Charts

Weekly charts

Year-end charts

References

2014 albums
Albums produced by DJ Muggs
Die Antwoord albums